Glen Charles Gordon (March 13, 1914September 16, 1977) was an American actor. Among other roles, Gordon played the role of Fu Manchu in the 1956 television series The Adventures of Dr. Fu Manchu.

He also starred in the S3E15 1961 episode of Gene Barry's TV Western series Bat Masterson, playing and wronged and revenge seeking former military corporal in "The Court Marshall of Major Mars".

References

External links
 

1914 births
1977 deaths
American male television actors
20th-century American male actors